The Asiatic rhinoceros beetle, coconut rhinoceros beetle or coconut palm rhinoceros beetle, (Oryctes rhinoceros) is a species of rhinoceros beetle of the family Scarabaeidae. O. rhinoceros attacks the developing fronds of raffia, coconut, oil,  and other palms in tropical Asia and a number of Pacific islands. Damaged fronds show typical triangular cuts. The beetle kills the palms (particularly newly planted ones) when the growing point is destroyed during feeding. They also infest dead trunk debris.

Biology
This large species has an average length of about 33 to 40 mm. Adults are dark brown to black in color with shiny dorsum. Head with a prominent horn. Male has longer horn than the female. Male is characterized by a rounded, shiny terminal abdominal segment whereas female has a relatively hairier 'tail'. There are two tubercles on the thoracic ridge.

Eggs
Adult female lay yellowish-white oval eggs which are about 3 mm in diameter. Eggs are typically laid inside rotting vegetative matter. After one week, they swell and later hatch within 11 to 13 days.

Larva
Grub stage undergo three instars before becoming a pupa. Grubs are yellowish-white where the third instar grow to 60 to 100 mm in length. Cranium is dark brown, with many round pits. There are minute setae on cranium. Thoracic spiracles are about 1.85 to 2.23 mm long. Respiratory plate consists with small, round to oval holes. Thoracic spiracles are larger than abdominal spiracles.

Pupa
Pupa is yellowish-brown with about 50 mm in length. There are horn-shaped protuberances on the anterior surface.

Economic importance
O. rhinoceros adults are nocturnal.

In 1964, accidental introduction in some countries, and the perceived threat led to a special United Nations fund being established through the South Pacific Forum, with the goal of "eradication of the rhinoceros beetle and related insects in the South Pacific".  Contributors to the fund were Australia, France, New Zealand, the United Kingdom, the United States of America, and Western Samoa.

Control measures include the use of cultural methods, such as crop sanitation and the use of cover crops, pheromones,  together with biological controls such as the manipulation of Metarhizium majus and M. anisopliae. A nudivirus - the Oryctes rhinoceros nudivirus (OrNV) - has been very successful in the Pacific islands and for 30 years the invasion was halted. However a new haplotype - CRB-G - has been invading the Pacific at a rate of about one new island every two years, unaffected by OrNV control programs already in place because CRB-G is immune.

The beetle is an invasive species in Hawaii, where it was found on December 23, 2013. It is believed to have been brought there in air cargo. Following the beetle's impact in Hawaii, there are now concerns about the potential consequences to Australia should the beetle be detected there. In June 2021, University of Queensland researcher Dr Kayvan Etebari and Central Queensland horticulturalist Neil Fisher both publicly expressed concerns about how close the species is to Australia and the threat it poses to the country's emerging date industry, ornamental palms and coconut oil industries.  Fisher said the beetle's impact to agriculture and horticulture in Hawaii has raised "red flags" in Australia. Etebari said it was important for Australia to assist its neighboring countries in controlling the beetle for both economic and humanitarian reasons due to the threat it poses to livelihoods.

Damage
In 1985, heavy infestations on coconut has been observed from Malaysia. Then in 1911, they appeared in Myanmar. In early 1900s, it was observed from potted rubber seedlings from Sri Lanka which was later introduced to Upolu island in Western Samoa in 1909. Adults and grubs usually attack coconut and oil palm cultivations, where they are considered as a major pests. Adults feed on crown region of the palms. Then they bore through petiole bases into the central unopened leaves. This results tissue maceration and dieback. Presence of the animal can be visible due to fibrous frass found inside and at the entrance to the feeding hole. Most often fronds became wedge-shaped gaps or characteristic V-shaped cuts to fronds.

Selected host plants
 Agave sisalana
 Ananas comosus
 Areca catechu
 Carica papaya
 Cocos nucifera
 Colocasia esculenta
 Corypha umbraculifera
 Elaeis guineensis
 Lantana camara
 Livistona chinensis
 Metroxylon sagu
 Musa x paradisiaca
 Pandanus
 Phoenix dactylifera
 Raphia ruffia
 Roystonea regia
 Saccharum officinarum
 Wodyetia bifurcata

Control
Adults can be removed by hand picking or other mechanical method. In biological control, they can be eradicated by using predators, pathogens and scoliid parasitoids. Apart from that, a male-produced aggregation pheromone, ethyl 4-methyloctanoate (E4-MO) is an effective method to control the adults. Under cultural control, breeding sites of the adult can be destroyed, as well as usage of cover crops, and use of a hooked piece of wire is effective. Meanwhile, several insecticides such as gamma-BHC, cypermethrin, lambda cyhalothrin, and naphthalene can be used.

Pathogens

The most widely used control pathogen appears to be Metarhizium majus, but entomopathogenic viruses have also been deployed.

Predators
 Alaus farinosus
 Alaus montravelii
 Alaus podargus
 Alaus speciosus
 Brachinus stenoderus
 Catascopus facialis
 Hololepta marginipunctata
 Hololepta quadridentata
 Lanelater bifoveatus
 Lanelater fuscipes
 Mecodema spinifer
 Neochryopus savagei
 Ochyropus gigas
 Oxylobus punctatosulcatus, 
 Pachylister chinensis
 Pheropsophus consimilis
 Pheropsophus lissoderus
 Pheropsophus occipitalis
 Pheropsophus sobrinus
 Pheropsophus stenoderus
 Placodes ebenenus
 Plaesius javanus
 Platymeris laevicollis
 Santalus parallelus
 Scarites dubiosus
 Scarites madagascariensis

Parasitoids
 Athogavia borneoica
 Boettcherisca peregrina
 Campsomeris azurea
 Elis romandi
 Hypoaspis dubia
 Rhabditis sp.
 Scolia cyanipennis
 Scolia oryctophaga
 Scolia patricialis
 Scolia procer
 Scolia quadripustulata
 Scolia ruficornis
 Steinernema carpocapsae

See also
 European rhinoceros beetle

References

External links

Species Profile - Coconut Rhinoceros Beetle (Oryctes rhinoceros), National Invasive Species Information Center, United States National Agricultural Library.
Coconut Rhinoceros Beetle Response Hawaii

Dynastinae
Beetles of Asia
Beetles described in 1758
Taxa named by Carl Linnaeus
Pests of oil palm